Beijing International Automotive Exhibition, Beijing Motor Show or Auto China is an auto show held biennially in Beijing, China since 1990. China is currently the largest auto market in the world.

2020
The 2020 Auto China show was due to open on 21 April but has been postponed due to health concerns relating to the Coronavirus. The new dates for 2020 are 26 September to 5 October.

Production cars 

 Audi A6 (facelift)
 Aston Martin DB5 GT-R Zagato
 Aston Martin Vantage GT3
 BAIC Arcfox Alpha T
 Baojun RC-5W
BMW 4 Series (G22) (redesign)
 BYD Han
 BYD Han EV
 Hongqi E115
 Hyundai Santa Fe (facelift)
 Hyundai Tucson (redesign)
Maserati Ghibli Hybrid
Maserati MC20
Mercedes-Benz S-Class (redesign)
Mercedes-Benz EQA
Mercedes-AMG GT Black Series
 MG 5
 Neta EP12
 Nio Formula E 2020-2021
 Nio EC6
 Nio ET5
 Nio ET7
 Nissan Ariya
 Rolls-Royce Ghost (redesign)
 Rimac C Two
 Polestar 3
 Soueast EX6
Volkswagen ID.4
Wuling Victory

Concept cars 
Audi AI:YOU
Leap Motors C-Culture
Lynk & Co Zero
Maxus XJC
MG Cyberster
Hyundai Prophecy EV
 Hozon Eureka 03
Roewe R-Aura
Volkswagen ID Rockezz

2018

Production cars 
 Mercedes-Benz A-Class (long-wheelbase saloon)
 BMW M2 Competition
 Lexus ES
 Škoda Kamiq
 Volkswagen Touareg

Concept cars 
 BMW iX3
 DS X E-Tense
 Mercedes-Maybach Ultimate Luxury SUV Concept
 MG X-Motion
 Pininfarina K350 Concept
 Pininfarina H500 Concept

2016

Production cars 

 Acura CDX
 Audi TT RS Coupe
 Bentley Mulsanne
 BMW X1 LWB
 BMW M4 GTS
 BMW M760Li xDrive
 Citroën C6
 DS 4S
 Ferrari GTC4Lusso (Asian debut)
 Geely Emgrand GS
 Jaguar XF L
 Lexus IS (facelift)
 Mazda CX-4
 Mercedes-Benz E-Class LWB
 Nissan Tiida
 Porsche 718 Cayman S
 Renault Koleos

Concept cars

 BAIC Arcfox-7 Concept
 BMW Concept Compact Sedan
 Chery FV2030 Concept
 Infiniti QX Sport Inspiration Concept
 LeEco LeSee Concept
 Volkswagen T-Prime Concept GTE
 Dongfeng Fengshen S30 PHEV concept

2014
Auto China 2014 was held at New China International Exhibition Center from April 20 to April 29.

Production cars

Baojun 730
Bugatti Veyron Grand Sport Vitesse Black Bess 
DS 6WR
Kia K3S
Koenigsegg One:1 (Asian debut)
Lamborghini Aventador Nazionale
Mercedes-Benz C-Class LWB
Rolls-Royce Phantom Pinnacle Travel 
Soueast V6 Lingshi Cross

Concept cars

Audi TT Allroad Concept

BAIC BJ100
BMW Vision Future Luxury Sedan
Chery Concept Alpha
Chery Beta 5 Concept
FAW Besturn Pi
Ford Everest Concept
GAC Trumpchi E-Jet
GAC Trumpchi GA6 Concept
Geely Emgrand Cross PHEV
Honda Spirior Concept
Hyundai ix25 Concept
JAC SC-9 Concept
Lincoln MKX Concept
Mercedes-Benz Concept Coupé SUV
Volkswagen Golf R 400 Concept

2012

Production cars

Aston Martin Dragon 88 Editions
Bentley Mulsanne Diamond Jubilee Edition
BMW 328Li and 335Li
BMW 7 Series Facelift
Bugatti Veyron Grand Sport Wei Long
Ferrari 458 Year Of The Dragon Edition
Infiniti M35hL
Jaguar XJ Ultimate
Land Rover Evoque Special Edition With Victoria Beckham
Lotus Evora GTE China Limited Edition
Mercedes-Benz G63 & G65 AMG
Nissan Sylphy
Porsche Cayenne GTS
Roewe 950 
Rolls-Royce Phantom Series II Extended Wheelbase
Subaru Outback sedan
Volkswagen E-Bugster Cabrio
Volkswagen Lavida

Concept cars

Audi A6L e-tron
Audi Q3 Jinlong Yufeng
Audi RS Q3
BMW i8 Spyder plug-in hybrid
Chery @Ant
Chrysler 300 Ruyi Design
Citroen Numero 9
Fiat Viaggio
Honda Concept C
Honda Concept S
Jeep Wrangler Dragon Design
Mercedes-Benz Concept Style Coupe
Lamborghini Urus
BYD Qin (pronounced “Chin”) plug-in hybrid  
Rolls-Royce Ghost Six Senses
SEAT Ibiza Cupra
Škoda Rapid
Toyota Dear Qin Hatchback and Sedan
Toyota Yundong Shuangqing

2010

Auto China 2010 was held at China International Exhibition Center from April 23 to May 2.

The following major introductions were presented at the 2010 show:

Production cars

Audi A8 L & W12
Audi A8 Hybrid (Chinese Introduction)
Beijing Automobile Works 007
BMW 5 series LWB
Bentley Continental GT Design Series China special edition
Bentley Continental Flying Spur Speed China special edition
Brilliance BS4 facelift
Brilliance FSV
Brilliance Jinbei H2L
BYD I6
BYD L3
BYD S6
Chery Rely X5
Chery Riich G3
Chery Riich G6
Chery Riich M1
Chery Riich X1
Chevrolet Sail 5-door hatchback
Chevrolet Spark (Chinese Introduction)
Dongfeng Fengshan H30 Cross
Dongfeng Fengshan S30 BSG Hybrid
Ferrari 599 GTO
Ford Edge (Chinese Introduction)
Ford Focus (Chinese Introduction)
Great Wall Haval H6
Great Wall Haval M3
Great Wall Haval SC60
Great Wall Voleex C50
Great Wall Voleex C70
Hawtai B11
Hawtai B35
Honda Crosstour (Chinese Introduction)
Hongqi HQE
Hyundai Verna
Infiniti QX56 (Chinese Introduction)
Kia SL (Chinese Introduction)
Lamborghini Murciélago LP 670-4 SuperVeloce China Limited Edition
Lifan SUV
Maybach 57/62 facelift
Mazda 8 (Chinese Introduction)
Mercedes-Benz E-Class LWB
Mercedes-Benz SLS AMG (Chinese Introduction)
Mini Countryman (Chinese Introduction)
Mitsubishi ASX (Chinese Introduction)
Nissan Leaf (Chinese Introduction)
Nissan March (Chinese Introduction)
Nissan NV200 (Chinese Introduction)
Porsche Cayenne (Chinese Introduction)
Porsche Panamera V6
Roewe 350
Roewe 550 XT
Roewe 750 Hybrid
Škoda Octavia facelift (Chinese Introduction)
Suzuki Kizashi (Chinese Introduction)
Volkswagen CC (Chinese Introduction)
Volkswagen Phaeton facelift
Volkswagen Sharan (Chinese Introduction)
Volkswagen Touareg Hybrid (Chinese Introduction)
Volvo S60 (Chinese Introduction)
Wuling Hong Guang
Youngman Europestar Lotus L5
ZAP Electric Taxi
Zotye Lang Jie
Zotye Lang Jun
Zotye Multiplan

Concept cars

BAIC B40
BAIC B61
BAIC B90 Hybrid
BAIC C60 (based on Saab 9-3)
BAIC C70 EV Concept
BAIC C71 & C71 EV (based on Saab 9-5)
BAIC EV Concept
BMW Concept Gran Coupe
BMW Megacity Concept
Brilliance EV Concept
Cadillac Converj Concept (Chinese Introduction)
Cadillac XTS Platinum Concept (Chinese Introduction)
Chang'an Mermaid Concept
Chang'an Green-i Concept
Chevrolet Aveo RS Concept (Chinese Introduction)
Chevrolet Volt MPV5 Concept
FAW E-COO Concept
FAW E-wing Concept
Ford Start Concept

GAC Trumpche
Geely Emgrand GE
Geely Emgrand GT
Geely Englon TXN Taxi
Geely Gleagle GS
IAT eTAXI Concept
IAT Wufeng 2 Concept
IAT Zhufeng Concept
JAC Vision IV
Li Nian Everus Concept
Mercedes-Benz Shooting Break Concept
MG Zero Concept
Mitsubishi Concept PX-MiEV (Chinese Introduction)
Porsche 918 Spyder Concept (Chinese Introduction)
Roewe E1 Concept
SAIC Leaf Concept
Toyota FT-86 Concept (Chinese Introduction)
Volkswagen E-Lavida EV Concept
Youngman Europestar Lotus L3 EV

See also
Automobile industry in China
Auto Shanghai
Auto Guangzhou

References

External links
Official site
 Auto China Official Site 2010
 Auto China Official Site 2010
 Beijing Autocar Show live news from Autocar

Auto shows in China
Automotive industry in China
Recurring events established in 1990
1990 establishments in China
Events in Beijing
Biennial events